Gioacchino (Jack) Lauro Li Vigni is a tenor opera singer who performs internationally.  He was born in Brooklyn, New York and raised in Palermo Italy. He is an alumnus of the Academy of Vocal Arts in Philadelphia, Pennsylvania.

Livigni won 1st-place winner of The Fritz and Lavinia Jensen Foundation Opera Competition in 2002, and made his Metropolitan Opera debut January 23, 2004 as Krushschov in the opera Boris Godunov. He has also sung  with Chicago Opera Theater as Ferrando in Così fan tutte, and was a soloist with Oper Frankfurt in the 2006/2007 season singing Don Ramiro in La Cenerentola.

References

External links
 Official web site (English)

Living people
American operatic tenors
Year of birth missing (living people)
Academy of Vocal Arts alumni
Musicians from Brooklyn
Musicians from Palermo
21st-century American male opera singers
Classical musicians from New York (state)